Wilhelm (Jakob) Ferdinand Kalle (born 19 February 1870 in Biebrich (Wiesbaden); died 7 September 1954 in Wiesbaden) was a German chemist, industrialist and politician.

Life 
His father was industrialist Wilhelme Kalle. He studied at University of Geneva and at University of Strasbourg. He was also general director of the Kalle chemical factory as well as a member for German People's Party of the Reichstag and Prussian state parliament.

External links

References

20th-century German chemists
German industrialists
20th-century German businesspeople
Members of the Reichstag of the Weimar Republic
Members of the Landtag of Prussia
1870 births
1954 deaths
Scientists from Wiesbaden
German People's Party politicians